Antonio Giolitti (12 February 1915 –  8 February 2010) was an Italian politician and cabinet member. He was the grandson of Giovanni Giolitti, the well-known liberal statesman of the pre-fascist period who served as Prime Minister of Italy five times.

Biography

Giolitti was born in Rome. He joined the Italian Communist Party (Italian: Partito Comunista Italiano, or PCI) in 1940 and was arrested and tried, but acquitted, for his associations with them.

In the spring of 1943 Giolitti resumed his clandestine activities, for the Communist Party, contacting numerous military and political personalities, in order plan the overthrow of the fascist regime. During World War II, Giolitti was seriously wounded in combat. He was sent to France to recover, and was not able to return to Italy until after the end of the conflict.

After the war, Giolitti was involved in much political activity: he was junior minister to the Foreign minister for Ferruccio Parri's government, communist deputy to the Constituent Assembly, elected to the Chamber of Deputies in the list of  PCI in 1948 and 1953.  In 1957 he left the Communist Party after the Hungarian uprising and The Manifesto of 101. He then joined the Italian Socialist Party.

Antonio Giolitti was a minister in several Italian governments. He was Minister for the Budget from 1963 to 1964, from 1969 to 1972 and from 1973 to 1974 in the governments led, respectively by Aldo Moro, Mariano Rumor and Emilio Colombo. In this capacity he inspirer the Italian economic planning. From 1977 to 1985, he was a member of the Executive Commission of the European Economic Community in Brussels, and responsible for Regional Policy.

In 1987, Giolitti left the Italian Socialist Party for disagreements with its leader Bettino Craxi. He then returned to the Italian Communist Party (PCI) as an independent candidate and he was elected to the Italian Senate. At the end of the Parliamentary term, he withdrew himself from active politics.

Antonio Giolitti has written  political texts and, in 1992, he published a book with his memoirs.

He also participated actively to the Italian cultural activity. In his youth, he was an advisor to the publisher Giulio Einaudi. He collaborated with several cultural magazines, including Lettera Internazionale.

In 2006, he was awarded the Cavaliere di Gran Croce, the highest honour bestowed by the President of the Italian Republic. He died in Rome on 8 February 2010.

References

1915 births
2010 deaths
Politicians from Rome
Italian Communist Party politicians
Italian Socialist Party politicians
Government ministers of Italy
Members of the Constituent Assembly of Italy
Deputies of Legislature I of Italy
Deputies of Legislature II of Italy
Deputies of Legislature III of Italy
Deputies of Legislature IV of Italy
Deputies of Legislature V of Italy
Deputies of Legislature VI of Italy
Deputies of Legislature VII of Italy
Senators of Legislature X of Italy
Italian European Commissioners
Italian resistance movement members
European Commissioners 1977–1981
European Commissioners 1981–1985